Zulfugar Abdulhuseyn oghlu Hajibeyov (17 April 1884 – 30 September 1950) was an Azerbaijani composer and a member of a family noted for its musical talents. He was one of the founders of the Azerbaijan Music Comedy Theater.

Biography
Hajibeyov was born in Shusha on 17 April 1884.

Hajibeyov's brother Uzeyir Hajibeyov is considered the "Father of Classical Music" in Azerbaijan. Their brother Jeyhun was a publicist, journalist, and ethnographer, and helped Uzeyir compose the opera Layla and Majnun.

His son, Niyazi Hajibeyov, was also a composer, and directed the Azerbaijan State Symphony Orchestra for 40 years.

Hajibeyov died on 30 September 1950.  He is buried in the Alley of Honor in Baku, Azerbaijan.  Hajibeyov's house in Shusha is classified as a historical monument "bearing state importance" by Azerbaijan.

Works

Musical comedies

Opera

 Ashiq Qarib ("The Wandering Ashiq"), after the anonymous Azerbaijani romantic dastan of the same name, 1915.

Film

With his son Niyazi, Hajibeyov wrote the music for one of the first films of Azerbaijan, Almaz, released in 1936.

References

1884 births
Azerbaijani composers
Azerbaijani opera composers
Soviet opera composers
1950 deaths
Musicians from Shusha
Male classical composers
20th-century male musicians
Honored Art Workers of the Azerbaijan SSR
Transcaucasian Teachers Seminary alumni